Mimer SQL is an SQL-based relational database management system produced by the Swedish company Mimer Information Technology AB (Mimer AB),  formerly known as Upright Database Technology AB.  It was originally developed as a research project at the Uppsala University, Uppsala, Sweden in the 1970s before being developed into a commercial product.

The database has been deployed in a wide range of application situations, including the National Health Service Pulse blood transfusion service in the UK, Volvo Cars production line in Sweden and automotive dealers in Australia.  It has sometimes been one of the limited options available in realtime critical applications and resource restricted situations such as mobile devices.

History
Mimer SQL originated from a project from the ITC service center supporting Uppsala University and some other institutions to leverage the relational database capabilities proposed by Codd and others.  The initial release in about 1975 was designated RAPID and was written in IBM assembler language.  The name was changed to Mimer in 1977 to avoid a trademark issue.  Other universities were interested in the project on a number of machine architectures and Mimer was rewritten in Fortran to achieve portability.  Further models were developed for Mimer with the Mimer/QL implementing the QUEL query languages.

The emergence of SQL in the 1980s as the standard query language resulted in Mimers' developers choosing to adopt it with the product becoming Mimer SQL.

In 1984 Mimer was transferred to the newly established company Mimer Information Systems.

Versions
 the Mimer SQL database server is currently supported on the main platforms of Windows, MacOS, Linux, and OpenVMS (Alpha and Integrity).  Previous versions of the database engine was supported on other operating systems including Solaris, AIX, HP-UX, Tru 64, SCO and DNIX.  Versions of Mimer SQL are available for download and free for development.

The Enterprise product is a standards based SQL database server based upon the Mimer SQL Experience database server.  This product is highly configurable and components can be added, removed or replacing in the foundation product to achieve a derived product suitable for embedded, real-time or small footprint application.

The Mimer SQL Realtime database server is a replacement database engine specifically designed for applications where real-time aspects are paramount.  This is sometimes marketed as the Automotive approach.  For resource limited environments the Mimer SQL Mobile database server is a replacement runtime environment without a SQL compiler.  This is used for portable and certain custom devices and is termed the Mobile Approach.

Custom embedded approaches can be applied to multiple hardware and operating system combinations.

These options enable Mimer SQL to be deployed to a wide variety of additional target platforms, such as Android, and real-time operating systems including VxWorks.

The database is available in real-time, embedded and automotive specialist versions requiring no maintenance, with the intention to make the product suitable for mission-critical automotive, process automation and telecommunication systems.

Features
Mimer SQL provides support for multiple database application programming interfaces (APIs): ODBC, JDBC, ADO.NET, Embedded SQL (C/C++, Cobol and Fortran), Module SQL (C/C++, Cobol, Fortran and Pascal), and the native API's Mimer SQL C API, Mimer SQL Real-Time API, and Mimer SQL Micro C API.

MimerPy is an adapter for Mimer SQL in Python.

The Mimer Provider Manager is an ADO.NET provider dispatcher that uses different plugins to access different underlying ADO.NET providers. The Mimer Provider Manager makes it possible to write database independent ADO.NET applications.

Mimer SQL mainly uses optimistic concurrency control (OCC) to manage concurrent transactions. This makes the database locking free and enables real-time predictability.

Mimer SQL is assigned port 1360 in the Internet Assigned Numbers Authority (IANA) registry.

Etymology
The name "Mimer" is taken from the Norse mythology, where Mimer was the giant guarding the well of wisdom, also known as "Mímisbrunnr". Metaphorically this is what a database system is doing managing data.

See also
 Werner Schneider the professor who started the development section for the relational database that became Mimer SQL (Swedish article)

References

External links
 Mimer SQL
 Official developer website

Proprietary database management systems
Relational database management systems
Real-time databases
Embedded databases
OpenVMS software